Brian's Song is the 2001 remake of the 1971 television film Brian's Song, telling the story of Brian Piccolo (Sean Maher), a white running back who meets, clashes with and befriends fellow Chicago Bears running back Gale Sayers (Mekhi Phifer). The movie was adapted from Sayers' own words in his 1970 autobiography, I am Third. The television movie, produced by Columbia TriStar Television, was first broadcast in the US on The Wonderful World of Disney on ABC.

In the movie, Piccolo is a brash rookie with the Bears. Initially thinking Sayers is arrogant – when he is only quiet and a slight bit anti-social – they rub each other the wrong way from the moment they meet. The movie, taking place from 1965 to 1970, as the civil rights movement grows, places great emphasis on integration, bringing up the conflict of when Brian and Gale room together for their first football season.

Plot
Brian and Gale aren't friends in the beginning; in fact they are rivals. Brian, during their first season together with pro football's Chicago Bears, is always one-upped by Gale, never being in the spotlight. After the season, Brian pledges to outplay Gale and take his position on the team.

During their second season, Gale is still the Bears' starting running back. After he is injured during a game and loses hope of ever playing again, Brian personally takes charge of his rehabilitation, on the basis that if Gale gives up, and Brian rises to the top, he would have made it only on a chance and not by his own prowess. The two bond during this time, soon becoming good friends and roommates.

Brian is diagnosed with cancer. The treatments and radiation therapy only do so much, and every time it seems as if everything is getting better, the cancer shows up again, someplace else. Brian dies from the disease at age 26. During this time, Gale stays by his side.

Cast
 Sean Maher as Brian Piccolo
 Mekhi Phifer as Gale Sayers
 Paula Cale as Joy Piccolo
 Elise Neal as Linda Sayers
 Aidan Devine as Abe Gibron 
 Dean McDermott as Ralph Kurek
 Ben Gazzara as Coach George Halas
 Michael Boisvert as Jack Concannon
 Jeff Ironi as Dick Butkus 
 Shane Daly as Bill Filbert
 Bruce Gooch as Ed McCaskey
 Craig Eldrige as Dr. Beattie
 Michael Miller as Dr. Fox 
 Shawn Lawrence as Dr. O'Conner
 Erika Cohen as Nurse
 Carly Marie Alves as Traci Piccolo (as Carley Marie Alves)
 Janessa Crimi as Lori Piccolo
 Patrick Salvagna as Brian Piccolo at 10
 Michael Birkett as Gale Sayers at 10
 Nigel Hamer as Master of Ceremonies
 James Arnold as Reporter #1
 Edgar George as Reporter #2
 Howard Hoover as TV Sportscaster
 Gary Fruchtman as Toastmaster
 Andrea Garnett as Gale's Mother
 Marvin Hinz as Brian's Father
 Tony Meyler as Gale's Father

External links

Chicago Bears
Sports films based on actual events
Films based on biographies
Columbia Pictures films
2001 television films
2001 films
American football films
Biographical films about sportspeople
Remakes of American films
Films directed by John Gray (director)
Cultural depictions of players of American football
2000s American films